Marit Knutsdatter Strand  (born 27 April 1992) is a Norwegian politician of the Centre Party. She was elected to the Storting in 2017, where she currently serves on the Standing Committee on Education, Research and Church Affairs. She heads the Centre Party electoral list in Oppland for the 2021 election.

References

1992 births
Living people
Centre Party (Norway) politicians
Members of the Storting
Oppland politicians